Nalumavadi  is a settlement on the southern edge of the Indian peninsula at about 9ºN latitude and 78ºE longitude, in Thoothukudi District. It has a population of approximately 5,486 spanning around 1378 households. There is an abundance of mango groves in the village amongst four large Mangifera indica trees. It has been named Nalumavadi in the local Tamil language, which means "under the shadow of four mango trees".

Religion

There are places of worship for Hindus and Muslims. A Church of South India congregation was established in 1841 by Reverend John Thomas and St John's church was built in 1842, extended in 1850 and rebuilt in 1926.  The pastorate is part of the Thoothukudi - Nazareth diocese.

Transport
Nearest Railway Stations: Kurumbur 1 km Katchanaavilai 500 meter  Tuticorin 35 km / Tirunelveli 40 km / Tiruchendur 17 km
Nearest Airports: Tuticorin 30 km / Madurai 145 km / Trivandrum 200 km

References

Villages in Thoothukudi district